Butolame, also known as 17β-((4-hydroxybutyl)amino)estradiol, is a synthetic, steroidal estrogen and a 17β-aminoestrogen with anticoagulant effects that was first described in 1993 and was never marketed.

References

Primary alcohols
Amines
Anticoagulants
Estranes
Synthetic estrogens